Kozarica  is a village in Croatia, and is a part of Mljet, Dubrovnik-Neretva County. 

Populated places in Dubrovnik-Neretva County
Mljet